William Eames (died 1637) was an English organist.

Career
Eames succeeded Thomas Weelkes as Organist of Winchester College in 1604, and was then Organist of Wimborne Minster from 1610–21. In 1624 he was admitted as Organist of Chichester Cathedral. An unknown offence occasioned his expulsion from office in 1635.

Eames is buried at Winchester College.

See also
 Organs and organists of Chichester Cathedral

References

1635 deaths
English classical organists
British male organists
Cathedral organists
Year of birth missing
Male classical organists